The Escort is a 1997 American erotic thriller film.

The Escort II

The film was followed by a sequel in 1998.

The Escort III

There was another sequel in 1999.

External links

Escort II at BFI

1997 films
American erotic thriller films
1990s erotic thriller films
Films directed by Jim Wynorski
1990s English-language films
1990s American films